The economy of Gaza City was dependent on small industries and agriculture. After years of decline, economic growth  in Gaza is now on the rise, boosted by foreign aid. According to the International Monetary Fund, the economy grew 20 percent in 2011, and the per capita gross domestic product increased by 19 percent.

History

19th century
In the 19th century, Gaza was among six soap-producing cities in the Levant, overshadowed only by Nablus. Its factories purchased qilw (alkaline soda) from merchants from Nablus and Salt in Jordan. Gaza's port was eclipsed by the ports of Jaffa and Haifa, but it retained its fishing fleet. Although its port was inactive, land commerce thrived because of its strategic location. Most caravans and travelers coming from Egypt stopped in Gaza for supplies, likewise Bedouins from Ma'an, east of the Wadi Araba, bought various sorts of provisions from the city to sell to Muslim pilgrims coming from Mecca. The bazaars of Gaza were well-supplied and were noted by Edward Robinson as "far better" than those of Jerusalem. Its principal commercial crop was cotton which was sold to the government and local Arab tribes.

Modern era

Many Gazans worked in the Israeli service industry while the border was open, but in the wake of Israel's 2005 disengagement plan, Gazans could no longer do so. According to OXFAM, Gaza suffered from serious shortages in housing, educational facilities, health facilities, infrastructure, and an inadequate sewage system, contributing to serious hygiene and public health problems. Food prices rose during the blockade, with wheat flour going up 34% and rice up 21%. The number of poor Gazans  increased sharply, with 80% relying on humanitarian aid in 2008 compared to 63% in 2006. In 2007, households spent an average of 62% of their total income on food, compared to 37% in 2004. In a decade, the number of families depending on UNRWA food aid increased ten-fold.

Increasing prosperity has led to the widespread replacement of donkey carts with tuk-tuks.

According to the International Monetary Fund, the unemployment rate  is falling. The economy of Gaza grew by 16% in the first half of 2010, almost twice as fast as the economy of the West Bank.

The European Union paid €420 million in aid to the Palestinian territories in 2001.  This was in addition to contributions by individual member states.  This included  €55 million form Germany, €67 million from France, and £63.6 million (about €76 million) from Great Britain in 2007 alone.  Donation levels have since increased, with the United States and the European Union giving $7.7 billion in 2008-2010.

In 2011 Gaza's economy increased by 27% while unemployment fell to 29%, its lowest in a decade. In 2012, Qatar donated 400 million dollars towards construction projects in the Gaza Strip.

Agriculture and industry
The major agricultural products are strawberries, citrus, dates, olives, flowers, and various vegetables. Pollution and massive population pressure on water have reduced the productive capacity of the surrounding farms, however.

Small-scale industries in the city include the production of plastics, construction materials, textiles, furniture, pottery, tiles, copperware, and carpets. Following the Oslo Accords, thousands of residents were employed in the various government ministries and security services, while others were employed by the UNRWA and other international organizations that support development of the city. Gaza City contains some minor industries, including textile production and food processing. A variety of wares are sold in Gaza's street bazaars, including carpets, pottery, wicker furniture and cotton clothing.

In 2012, 250 trucks a day passed through the Kerem Shalom border crossing, transporting goods from Israel to the Gaza Strip. Since 2010, NIS 75 million have been invested in upgrading and expanding the crossing, which is capable of handling 450 trucks a day. The Palestinian side of the crossing is operated by two families who were granted a franchise by the Palestinian Authority and authorized by Hamas. The Ministry of Commerce and Industry in Ramallah coordinates activity with Israel. The two sides are 400 meters apart, separated by a drop-off zone for unloading goods.

Military Conflicts between Hamas and Israel
Several military conflicts have seriously damaged the Gazan economy since Hamas took political control.

1) 27 December 2008 - 18 January 2009 (3 weeks)

2) 14–21 November 2012 (1 week)

3) 8 July – 26 August 2014 (7 weeks)

4) 11–13 November 2018 (2 days)

5) 10–21 May 2021 (11 days)

Economic collapse
In August 2020, Ali al-Hayek, the head of the Palestinian Businessmen's Association in Gaza, told The Media Line that "Gaza's economy has completely collapsed, especially amid the latest escalation, where closing the Kerem Shalom cargo crossing and not allowing the entry of fuel and industrial materials led to an economic catastrophe," he said.

The industrial sector has come to a complete halt, leaving thousands of workers without jobs, added to the already collapsing situation, Hayek said. "The private sector in Gaza is almost dead; we're facing a serious collapse that is reflected in social issues because of the suspension of the economic system.

"Economic activity has completely stopped in Gaza," he said.

Hayek said 2020 was the Strip's worst year yet, with the current difficulties coming atop the problems suffered since 2007, when Gazans faced daily closures. "But today, we are talking about a complete stop [to economic activity] because of the previously existing crisis and the current halt of electric service."

Providing the population of the Gaza Strip with a 24/7 power supply requires about 600 megawatts of electricity. Yet the Gaza Strip receives only 180 megawatts — 120 directly from Israel via 10 power lines, and 60 generated by Gaza's power plant with Qatari-funded fuel provided by Israel. As a result, residents usually receive power in eight-hour rotations: eight hours on and eight hours off. In summer, the power can go off for up to 12 hours. Bombing the power plant 14 years ago and preventing its rehabilitation since has limited its capacity to generate electricity. In addition, Israel hampers vital repairs and upgrades to the power system and forces the authorities to buy fuel from Israel alone.

May 2021 Conflict
Since the fighting began, Gaza's infrastructure, already weakened by a 14-year blockade, has rapidly deteriorated. Medical supplies, water and fuel for electricity are running low in the territory. Israeli attacks have also damaged at least 18 hospitals and clinics and destroyed one health facility, the World Health Organization said. Nearly half of all essential drugs have run out. Israeli bombing has damaged over 50 schools across the territory, according to advocacy group Save the Children, destroying at least six. While repairs are done, education will be disrupted for nearly 42,000 children.

Recreation industry
In 2010 Gaza experienced a boom in the construction of for-profit recreational facilities aimed not at tourists but at residents, including the many employees of international aid organizations. Some of the new amusement parks and restaurants are Hamas business ventures.  The many new leisure facilities include the Crazy Water Park, the Al-Bustan resort (Gaza), and the Bisan City tourist village.  Among the many new restaurants are the Roots Club, the Faisal Equestrian Club and the new restaurant at the Gaza Museum of Archaeology.

The Crazy Water Park was one of a number of seaside tourist resorts constructed in a $20 million building binge. The resort was built by a Hamas-linked charity. According to Al-Ahram Weekly, the park was one of several Gaza leisure parks, including Zahrat al-Madain, the Al-Bustan resort and the Bisan City tourist village. The report states that "a sense of absolute prosperity prevails, as manifested by the grand resorts along and near Gaza's coast...The sight of the merchandise and luxuries filling the Gaza shops amazed me. Merchandise is sold more cheaply than in Egypt, although most of it is from the Egyptian market, and there are added shipping costs and costs for smuggling it via the tunnels – so that it could be expected to be more expensive..... Many of these facilities are no longer extant. The Crazy Water Park was burned down a few months after it was built, and the Bisan City tourist village was so damaged by Israeli shelling in 2014 that they had to send animals to Jordan for safe-keeping.

Tourism

There are several hotels in Gaza including the hotel at the Gaza Museum of Archaeology and the Palestine, Adam, al-Amal, al-Quds, Cliff, and Marna House hotels. All, except the Palestine Hotel, are located along the coast. The United Nations (UN) has a beach club on the same street. Gaza is not a frequent destination of tourists, and most foreigners who stay in hotels are journalists, aid workers, UN and Red Cross personnel. Al-Quds Hotel is known as the "poshest" hotel in the city.  The upscale Roots Club is among the nicest of several new restaurants in Gaza.

Unemployment
In 2007, unemployment in the Gaza Strip reached 40%. According to Oxfam, the private sector which employs 53% of all working Gazans was devastated and many businesses went bankrupt. Of the 110,000 workers in this sector, approximately 75,000 lost their jobs. 95% of the city's industrial operations were suspended due to the inaccessibility to inputs for production and the inability to export products.

In June 2005, there were 3,900 factories in the city employing 35,000 people, and in December 2007, there were 195 factories remaining, employing 1,700 people. The construction industry was also affected, with tens of thousands of labourers out of work. The blockade damaged the agriculture sector and 40,000 workers dependent on cash crops were left without income. Unemployment was compounded when Israel ended its reliance on cheap labor from the Gaza Strip in 2005. In September 2000, 24,000 Palestinians crossed out of Gaza daily to work in Israel.

See also
Blockade of the Gaza Strip
Economy of the Gaza Strip

References

Bibliography

Gaza City
Economy of the Gaza Strip
Economy of the State of Palestine
Gaza City